Fuchsia huertasi is a species of moth of the family Depressariidae. It is found in Spain.

References

External links
lepiforum.de

Moths described in 1995
Depressariinae